Huta Dłutowska  is a village in the administrative district of Gmina Dłutów, within Pabianice County, Łódź Voivodeship, in central Poland.

The village has a population of 220.

Famous people
 Janusz Bolonek, bishop and nuncio

References

Villages in Pabianice County